Kenney Bertz (born December 7, 1983 in Fountain Valley, California) is an American former soccer player. He spent the majority of his professional career in the United States with the Rochester Rhinos in the USL First Division.

College and Amateur soccer 

Bertz attended the University of Maryland, College Park where he played on the men’s soccer team from 2002 to 2005.  His senior season, the Terrapins won the NCAA Men's Soccer Championship.  In 2003, he also played for the Columbus Shooting Stars in the USL Premier Development League.

Professional soccer 

On January 20, 2006, D.C. United selected Bertz in the fourth round (47th overall) in the 2006 MLS SuperDraft. The Portland Timbers also selected him in the 2006 USL Draft.  He elected to pursue a contract with United, but after failing in that effort, signed with the Rochester Rhinos of the USL First Division. In 2007, he acted as captain of the Rhinos for part of the season.

In January 2008, he signed with SV Elversberg of the German Regionalliga. On August 11, 2008, he rejoined the Rhinos, signing a two year contract.

Retirement 

In December, 2009, Kenney announced through the Rochester Democrat & Chronicle and on the local talk radio show "Kick This" that he would be retiring from professional soccer to pursue a career in law enforcement.
In September, 2010 Kenney began his training in law enforcement with the Butler Tech Police Academy. 
According to Kenney's LinkedIn profile, he joined the law firm as a legal assistant in January 2011.

References

External links 

 Rochester Rhinos bio

1983 births
Living people
American expatriate soccer players in Germany
Columbus Shooting Stars players
Maryland Terrapins men's soccer players
USL First Division players
Rochester New York FC players
SV Elversberg players
People from Fountain Valley, California
Soccer players from California
American soccer players
USL League Two players
D.C. United draft picks
Association football defenders
Sportspeople from Orange County, California
Regionalliga players
American expatriate soccer players